The Boston Driver's Handbook: Wild in the Streets is a 1982 humorous guide to driving in Boston by Ira Gershkoff and Richard Trachtman.

A 3rd edition, The Boston Driver's Handbook: Wild in the Streets--The Almost Post Big Dig Edition, was published in 2004.

References 

Comedy books
1982 non-fiction books
Books about Boston